Transmembrane protein 243 is a protein that in humans is encoded by the TMEM243 gene.

References

Further reading